Jaime Kaplan (born October 1, 1961) is an American former professional tennis player.

Biography
Kaplan grew up in Macon, Georgia and remained unbeaten throughout her high school tennis career at Stratford Academy. She started her collegiate career at the University of Georgia, where she won the SEC doubles title in 1981, then played for Florida State University and was their first tennis player to qualify for the NCAA Championships. While at Florida State she was the Metro Conference singles champion in 1983 and also won two Metro doubles titles.

For the remainder of the 1980s, Kaplan competed on the professional tour and featured in the main draw of all four grand slam tournaments as a doubles player. Her best performance came at the 1987 Wimbledon Championships, where she made the round of 16 in the mixed doubles. She had a best doubles ranking of 91 in the world.

ITF finals

Doubles: 12 (6–6)

References

External links
 
 

1961 births
Living people
American female tennis players
Tennis people from Georgia (U.S. state)
Georgia Lady Bulldogs tennis players
Florida State Seminoles women's tennis players
Sportspeople from Macon, Georgia